Oppeliidae are compressed to oxyconic, sculptured Haploceratoidea, either unkeeled, unicarinate, bicarinate, or tricarinate; with sutures in great variety, but ribbing usually more or less falcoid or falcate. The Oppeliidae is the principal family of the Haploceratoidea, with the longest duration, extending from the Middle Jurassic (Bajocian) to the Upper Cretaceous (Cenomanian) Their derivation is from the Hildoceratoidea.

Subfamilies
Nine subfamilies are recognized, the first eight of which are included in the earlier Treatise, Part L. They are the:
Oppeliinae
Hecticoceratinae
Distchoceratinae
Teramelliceratinae
Phlycticeratinae
Streblitinae
Mazapilitinae
Aconeceratinae
Binneyitinae

The Binneyitinae was added by Donovan et al, 1981, transferred from the Stephanoceratoidea.

References

 D.T Donavan, J.H. Callomon, and M.K Howarth. 1981.  Classification of the Jurassic Ammonitina. In The Ammonoidea. M.R. House and J.R. Senior, eds. Systematics Assoc.  Pub  Academic Press. 
 Treatise on Invertebrate Paleontology Part L Mollusca 4, Mesozoic Ammonoidea. R.C Moore (ed.); Geol. Society of America and Univ. Kansas Press. (1957)

 
Ammonitida families
Haploceratoidea
Bajocian first appearances
Cenomanian extinctions